The 2015 Summit League softball tournament will be held at Ellig Sports Complex on the campus of the North Dakota State University in Fargo, North Dakota from May 7 through May 10, 2015. The tournament winner will earn The Summit League's automatic bid to the 2015 NCAA Division I softball tournament. All games will be streamed online on gobison.com/watch.

Tournament

Elimination Thursday

Double Elimination Tournament

All times listed are Central Daylight Time.

References

Tournament
Summit League Tournament